Atlee is a locality in Special Area No. 2, Alberta, Canada.

The community is named after W. Atlee James, a railroad official.

See also 
List of communities in Alberta
List of ghost towns in Alberta

References 

Localities in Special Area No. 2